Bryant Field  is a public airport located in Bridgeport, California, USA. 

It is operated by Mono County.

References

External links 

Airports in Mono County, California